Donald Chandler may refer to:

 Don Chandler (1934–2011), American football player
 Donald S. Chandler, entomologist